Jayde Andrew Julius (born 27 August 1993 in Bellville) is a South African cyclist, who currently rides for UCI Continental team .

Major results

2011
 2nd Remouchamps–Ferrières–Remouchamps
2015
 African Road Championships
1st  Under-23 road race
7th Road race
 1st  Road race, National Under-23 Road Championships
 3rd Road race, National Road Championships
2016
 5th Road race, National Road Championships
2018
 2nd Overall Tour de Limpopo
1st Stage 4 (TTT)
 2nd 100 Cycle Challenge
 4th Time trial, National Road Championships
2019
 1st  Team time trial, African Games
 1st 100 Cycle Challenge
 Challenge du Prince
1st Trophée Princier
2nd Trophée de la Maison Royale
 5th Time trial, National Road Championships
 8th Road race, African Road Championships
 10th Overall Tour de Limpopo
2020
 3rd Road race, National Road Championships

References

External links

1993 births
Living people
South African male cyclists
Competitors at the 2019 African Games
African Games competitors for South Africa
20th-century South African people
21st-century South African people